Cycloxanthops is a genus of crabs in the family Xanthidae, containing the following species:

 Cycloxanthops bocki Garth, 1957
 Cycloxanthops novemdentatus (Lockington, 1877)
 Cycloxanthops occidentalis (A. Milne Edwards, 1868)
 Cycloxanthops sexdecimdentatus (H. Milne Edwards & Lucas, 1843)
 Cycloxanthops truncatus (De Haan, 1837)
 Cycloxanthops vittatus (Stimpson, 1860)

References

Xanthoidea